= Core collapse =

Core collapse can refer to:

- The collapse of the stellar core of a massive star, such as the core collapse that produces a supernova
- Core collapse (cluster), the dynamic process that leads to a concentration of stars at the core of a globular cluster
